Camp New York is a United States Military installation in Kuwait.

Located in the Udairi Range Complex, Camp New York is a staging post with a close proximity to Camp Buehring. It has been open and closed several times since 2004, and is currently used primarily to handle personnel influxes that nearby Camp Buehring would be unable to accommodate.

History
From the end of Operation Desert Storm (and the subsequent redeployment of troops) in 1991, and through the 11 September attacks, Camp New York was simply called "The Kabal," as it was the only camp that existed at that time. Shortly after the attacks the Second Brigade Combat Team of the First Cavalry Division along with the Third Battalion, Eighth Cavalry Regiment (which had recently returned from Operation Desert Spring), deployed to the newly named Camp New York and subsequently built Camp Virginia and Camp Pennsylvania, fitting names as this deployment was in support of Operation Enduring Freedom.

As a temporary staging post, Camp New York does have a few personnel facilities, but most operations are typically maintained at Buerhing.

Military installations of the United States in Kuwait